Welcome to the Breakdown is the second extended play by American chiptune-based rock band I Fight Dragons. It was released under Atlantic Records, both on iTunes and their website, the latter offering the IFD exclusive "She's Got Sorcery" with the digital download.  The title track "Welcome to the Breakdown" and the song "She's Got Sorcery" were both sent out via e-mail to all mailing list subscribers prior to the release of the album.

The band would then continue to release the second exclusive bonus track of the album, "I Fight Ganon (Studio Version)", through the IFD Mailing list. The track is a full studio recording of their popular recreation of the theme to the video game series, The Legend of Zelda.

Track listing

Personnel
Brian Mazzaferri – Lead Vocals, Guitar
Packy Lundholm – Vocals, Guitar
Hari Rao – Bass
Chad Van Dahm - Drums
Bill Prokopow – Vocals, Keyboards, Production

References

2010 EPs
I Fight Dragons albums